Clara Campoamor Rodríguez (12 February 1888 – 30 April 1972) was a Spanish politician, lawyer and writer, considered by some the mother of the Spanish feminist movement. She was one of the main promoters for women's suffrage in Spain, included in the Spanish Constitution of 1931 in part owing to her advocacy.

She was elected to the Constituent Assembly in 1931, before women were allowed to vote themselves. She later lost her parliamentary seat and briefly served as a government minister, before fleeing the country during the Spanish Civil War. Campoamor died in exile in Switzerland, and was later buried at the Polloe Cemetery in San Sebastian, Spain.

Biography
Clara Campoamor Rodríguez was born on 12 February 1888 in Madrid, Spain to a working-class family, she began working as a seamstress at age 13, but continued to study part-time on the side, eventually seeking to pass the test that would guarantee her entry into law school. In the interim, she worked her way up through a number of government positions, first with the Post Office in San Sebastián in 1909, then as a typing teacher back in Madrid in 1914. In addition to her job as a teacher, Campoamor became involved in the Madrid political scene through a second job as a journalist at the newspaper La Tribuna, where she got in touch with influential feminine figures of the time, such as Carmen de Burgos and Eva Nelken. These acquaintances led Clara Campoamor to join and collaborate with various feminist associations. and to write political commentary 

After successfully passing the law school entrance exam and entering the University of Madrid School of Law, Campoamor continued to work multiple jobs; as a teacher, as a secretary for the newspaper, as a typist for the government and as a French translator. After she earned her degree in 1924, aged 36, and entered legal practice, Campoamor began participating in debate and intellectual societies in Madrid. Indeed, she was the second woman to ever incorporate the Madrid Bar Association, the first one to defend a case before the Spanish High Court, and one of the first to represent Spain in the League of Nations. Her private practice specialized in issues affecting women, including paternity cases and marital law. She would champion these issues in the professional organizations she became a member of, and the International Federation of Women Lawyers – an organization that she helped found in 1928. Campoamor successfully advocated in 1927 for improvements to the child labor laws and electoral law changes. When it became legal for women to run for the Constituent Assembly that would write a new constitution in 1931, she stood for a seat and was elected despite her inability to vote in the election.

On October of the same year, and using her position in the constituent assembly, she became the first woman to address it, in a memorable speech warning the male members of the assembly that their continued exclusion of women from voting was a violation of natural law: “To all deputies: I am a citizen before I am a woman. And I reckon it would be a tremendous political mistake not to allow women to exercise this right, women that look up to and trust you; women that, similarly to the French Revolution, will undoubtedly be a new power to our laws, and you only have to open their way”. Campoamor affirmed that a Republic could not be built without half the citizenship of the country and thus, women needed to be given the right to vote.

Her advocacy for women's rights was opposed not only by political conservatives and conservative Roman Catholics but by men on the left and one of only two other women in the assembly, Victoria Kent, who believed women would be influenced by Catholic priests. When her own party decided to oppose women's suffrage, she left the party and continued to advocate for suffrage as an independent member of the assembly. She maintained an independent affiliation amid a strong party system at the time, with the support of women's activists throughout Spain she was able to secure equal legal status for women in the new constitution. Throughout her political career, Campoamor insisted that her main role was to be a spokesperson for women, and women's issues remained her primary concern. Indeed, Campoamor participated and promoted the abolition of prostitution. It started as a debate in Congress in 1932, and the legislation got approved in 1935. Her reasons to impulse it were the potential for human trafficking and exploitation of the activity, and the circumstances some of the women were subjected to. She also used the Commission for the Protection of Women and Against Human Trafficking of the League of Nations, urging the Spanish Congress to abolish prostitution in line with its European neighbours.

Following the assembly's drafting of the new constitution, Campoamor became a political outcast because of her outspoken advocacy and willingness to abandon her party on principle. She lost her seat in parliament in 1933, but was appointed Director of Public Welfare from 1933 to 1934. In 1936, as the start of the Spanish Civil War brought violence to Madrid, she fled the country in fear for her life. She spent a decade in Buenos Aires as a translator and biographer, to finally settle in Lausanne, Switzerland and work as a lawyer. She could never go back to Spain, since she was barred from returning to Francoist Spain, unless she disclosed the names of allies and publicly apologized for past statements against the Catholic Church. Indeed, she was sentenced to 12 years of prison if she ever went back to her home country. As an exile, she continued to write about feminism and her experiences in politics.

Campoamor died in exile in 1972. Her ashes were repatriated and buried at the Polloe Cemetery in San Sebastián in May 1972.

Women's suffrage 

After start of the Second Republic, Campoamor was elected deputy of Madrid constituency in the 1931 elections (then women could be elected, but not vote) by the Radical Party. She had joined this party because it was "republican, liberal, secular and democratic" and followed her own political ideology. She was part of the Constitutional Commission in charge of the preparation of the draft of the Constitution of the new republic composed of 21 deputies.

In that body, she fought against sexual discrimination, for the legal equality of children born within and outside marriage, the right to divorce and universal suffrage, often called the "women's vote". The latter was a fight towards a more just and equalitarian Spanish Republic. Through perseverance and after her memorable speech, women's right to vote was approved on October 1, 1931, with 161 votes in favour, 121 votes against and 188 abstentions. Women’ suffrage also consolidated the role of women in political life, and allowed them to be part of it, rather than mere observers. The first election in which women were allowed to participate in Spain was in 1933, and only 3 years later, in 1936 (months before the coup d’état), Federica Montseny would become the first female minister in the history of western Europe.

Although Campoamor is said to be the mother of the feminist movement in Spain, Spanish women had followed the UK and US suffragettes in the 1920s, creating the Asociación Nacional de Mujeres Españolas (National Association of Spanish Women) in 1918, and celebrating the first feminist demonstration in Spain in 1921. A remarkable figure of said association was Carmen de Burgos, with which Campoamor would establish a relationship during her time as a teacher in Madrid, before law school. Even prior to said movement, an attempt to women's suffrage had been made in 1907.

The Left, with the exception of a group of Socialists and some Republicans, did not want women to vote because they were supposed to be heavily influenced by the Church and would vote in favor of the Right. Therefore, the Socialist Radical Party faced Clara with another recognized deputy, Victoria Kent, who was against the women's right to vote. The final debate was on October 1. Campoamor was considered the winner, and as a consequence, the adoption of the article 36, which enabled women's suffrage, was achieved with 161 votes in favor, 121 against. She was supported by most of the Socialist Party members – with some important exceptions like Indalecio Prieto – many of the right, almost all members of Republican Left of Catalonia and small republican groups like the Progressives and the Association of Defense of the Republic. The Republican Action, the radical socialist party of Spain, opposed her despite her membership in and support of the party.

Neither she nor Victoria Kent managed to renew their seats in the 1933 elections. In 1934, Campoamor left the Radical Party because of its subordination to the CEDA and the excesses in the repression of the insurrection in Asturias. In that same year, she tried (through the mediation of Prime Minister Santiago Casares Quiroga) to join the Republican Left, but her admission was denied. It was then she wrote and published – in May 1935 – Mi pecado mortal. El voto femenino y yo, a testimony of her parliamentary struggles.

Legacy 

After the Spanish transition to democracy, there were many tributes and recognitions sponsored by organizations in favour of women's equality. Various institutes, schools, cultural centers, women's associations, parks and streets were renamed in Campoamor's honor. In 1998 the Ministry of Equality of Andalusian PSOE established Clara Campoamor Awards which are recognized annually. There is one per province and especially dedicated to those individuals or groups that have been important in the defense of women's equality.

For a long time, Clara Campoamor's figure was forgotten. However, her crucial role in Spanish politics and fight for women's rights has been commemorated in more recent times, celebrating the 90th anniversary of the Spanish Universal Suffrage approval in Congress. She dedicated her life and career to stand up and fight for women's rights, writing the biographies of Concepción Arenal and Juana Inés de la Cruz during her time in Argentina. Moreover, she participated in various publications and wrote articles for numerous newspapers in Buenos Aires (some of which can be found in La mujer en la diplomacia y otros escritos).

In 2006 Madrid Town Hall created an award with her name, which in its first edition was given to the lawyer and feminist María Telo Núñez.

In 2006, following the 75th anniversary of the women's right to vote in Spain, a campaign for the Congress of Deputies to recognize her contributions via a bust in its facilities was undertaken. In November, the Socialist Party (PSOE) presented an informal proposal asking its Government that their equal policies will be reflected in the production of the euro. Clara Campoamor was the female figure chosen to appear on future euro coins, as the leading advocate of women's suffrage in the Second Republic. This proposal was approved on 12 June 2007 by the Congress, with the support of all parliamentary groups except the Conservative Party (PP), which abstained.

In 2007, the Ministry of Development launched the ship Polivalente B-32 "Clara Campoamor", named in her honor and operated by the Maritime Security and Rescue Society.

In 2011, due to the centenary of International Women's Day, the National Mint and Stamp produced a commemorative silver coin valued at 20 euros. This coin shows the picture of Clara Campoamor.

In 2016, Norwegian Airlines named one of its new Boeing 737-800 aircraft (EI-FJY) 'Clara Campoamor' with her photo covering both sides of the plane's fin (vertical stabiliser).

On 23 December 2020, Madrid Chamartín railway station was officially renamed Madrid-Chamartín-Clara Campoamor.

In 2021, the European Parliament named one of their buildings in Brussels "Campoamor" in her honour.

Depictions

See also
 List of 20th-century feminists
 List of suffragists and suffragettes
 Timeline of women's suffrage
Role of women in Spanish society

References

External links
 

1888 births
1972 deaths
Politicians from Madrid
Radical Republican Party politicians
Members of the Congress of Deputies of the Second Spanish Republic
Spanish feminists
Exiles of the Spanish Civil War in Switzerland
20th-century Spanish lawyers
Spanish women lawyers
Spanish suffragists
20th-century Spanish women politicians